The role of women in Judaism is determined by the Hebrew Bible, the Oral Law (the corpus of rabbinic literature), by custom, and by cultural factors. Although the Hebrew Bible and rabbinic literature mention various female role models, religious law treats women differently in various circumstances. According to a 2017 study by the Pew Research Center, women are slightly more numerous among worldwide Jewish population (52%).

Gender has a bearing on familial lines: In traditional Judaism, Jewishness is passed down through the mother, although the father's name is used to describe sons and daughters in the Torah, e. g., "Dinah, daughter of Jacob".

The status of Levi is only given to a Jewish male descended patrilineally from Levi; likewise a Kohen descends from Aharon, the first Kohen. A Bat-Kohen or Bat-Levi has that status from her Jewish father with the corresponding HaKohen/HaLevi title.

Biblical times

Compared to men, relatively few women are mentioned in the Bible by name and role. Those who are mentioned include the Matriarchs Sarah, Rebecca, Rachel, and Leah; Miriam the prophetess; Deborah the Judge; Huldah the prophetess; Abigail, who married David; Rahab; and the Persian Jewish queen Esther. A common phenomenon in the Bible is the pivotal role that women take in subverting man-made power structures. The result is often a more just outcome than what would have taken place under ordinary circumstances. Today, many of them are considered foundational by feminists because of the insights they provide into the lives of Jewish women during those times, albeit as notable examples of women who broke the male dominance of historical documentation of the time compared to the poor documentation of most women's lives.

According to Jewish tradition, a covenant was formed between the Israelites and the God of Abraham at Mount Sinai. The Torah relates that both Israelite men and Israelite women were present at Sinai; however, the covenant was worded in such a way that it bound men to act upon its requirements and to ensure that the members of their household (wives, children, and slaves) met these requirements as well. In this sense, the covenant bound women as well, though indirectly.

Marriage and family law in biblical times favored men over women. For example, a husband could divorce a wife if he chose to, but a wife could not divorce a husband without his consent. The practice of levirate marriage applied to widows of childless deceased husbands, not to widowers of childless deceased wives; though, if either he or she did not consent to the marriage, a different ceremony called chalitza is done instead, which basically involves the widow's removing her brother-in-law's shoe, spitting in front of him, and proclaiming, "This is what happens to someone who will not build his brother's house!" Laws concerning the loss of female virginity have no male equivalent. Many of these laws, such as levirate marriage, are no longer practiced in Judaism (chalitzah is practiced in lieu of levirate marriage). These and other gender differences found in the Torah suggest that biblical society viewed continuity, property, and family unity as paramount; however, they also suggest that women were subordinate to men during biblical times. Men were required to perform some specific obligations for their wives, but these often reinforced the gendered roles in the culture of the time. These included the provision of clothing, food, and sexual relations to their wives.

Women also had a role in ritual life. Women (as well as men) were required to make a pilgrimage to the Temple in Jerusalem once a year (men each of the three main festivals if they could) and offer the Passover sacrifice. They would also do so on special occasions in their lives such as giving a todah ("thanksgiving") offering after childbirth. Hence, they participated in many of the major public religious roles that non-Levitical men could, albeit less often and on a somewhat smaller and generally more discreet scale.

According to Jewish tradition, Michal, the daughter of Saul and David's first wife, accepted the commandments of tefillin and tzitzit although these requirements applied only to men. Many of the mitzvot that applied to men applied to women as well; however, women were usually exempt from positive time-bound commandments (requirements to perform duty at a specific time, as opposed to requirements to perform duty at any time or requirements to abstain from an act). There are two prominent theories about why this is: pragmatism (because the role of women in household duties consumes their time) and spirituality (because according to some traditions, "women have superior inherent spiritual wisdom", known as bina, that makes them less dependent than men on the performance of timely religious practices to retain a strong spiritual connection to God).

Women depended on men economically. Women generally did not own property except in the rare case of inheriting land from a father who did not bear sons. Even "in such cases, women would be required to remarry within the tribe so as not to reduce its land holdings".

Talmudic times
Women are required by halacha to carry out all negative mitzvot (i. e., commandments that prohibit activities such as "Thou shalt not commit adultery"), but they are excused from doing most time-bound, positive mitzvot (i. e., commandments that prescribe ritual action that must be done at certain times such as hearing a shofar on Rosh Hashanah). A woman would not, however, be prohibited from doing a mitzvah from which she was excused. Halacha also provided women with some material and emotional protections related to marriage, and divorce that most non-Jewish women did not enjoy during the first millennium of the Common Era. The penal and civil law of the time treated men and women equally.

There is evidence that, at least among the elite, women were educated in the Bible and in halacha. The daughter of a scholar was considered a good prospect for marriage in part because of her education. There are stories in the Talmud about women whose husbands died or were exiled and yet were still able to educate their children because of their own level of learning.

Classical Jewish rabbinical literature contains quotes that may be seen as both laudatory and derogatory of women. The Talmud states that:
 Greater is the reward to be given by the All-Mighty to the (righteous) women than to (righteous) men
 Ten measures of speech descended to the world; women took nine
 Women are light on raw knowledge – i. e., they possess more intuition
 A man without a wife lives without joy, blessing, and good; a man should love his wife as himself and respect her more than himself
When Rav Yosef b. Hiyya heard his mother's footsteps he would say: Let me arise before the approach of the divine presence
 Israel was redeemed from Egypt by virtue of its (Israel) righteous women
 A man must be careful never to speak slightingly to his wife because women are prone to tears and sensitive to wrong
 Women have greater faith than men
 Women have greater powers of discernment
 Women are especially tenderhearted

While few women are mentioned by name in rabbinic literature, and none are known to have authored a rabbinic work, those who are mentioned are portrayed as having a strong influence on their husbands. Occasionally they have a public persona. Examples are Bruriah, the wife of the Tanna Rabbi Meir; Rachel, wife of Rabbi Akiva; and Yalta, the wife of Rabbi Nachman. Eleazar ben Arach's wife Ima Shalom counseled her husband in assuming leadership over the Sanhedrin. When Eleazar ben Arach was asked to assume the role of Nasi ("Prince" or President of the Sanhedrin), he replied that he must first take counsel with his wife, which he did.

Middle Ages 
Since Jews were seen as second-class citizens in the Christian and Muslim world (legally known in the Muslim world as dhimmi), it was even harder for Jewish women to establish their own status. Avraham Grossman argues in his book, Pious and Rebellious: Jewish Women in Medieval Europe, that three factors affected how Jewish women were perceived by the society around them: "the biblical and Talmudic heritage; the situation in the non-Jewish society within which the Jews lived and functioned; and the economic status of the Jews, including the woman's role in supporting the family." Grossman uses all three factors to argue that women's status overall during this period actually rose.

During the Middle Ages, there was a conflict between Judaism's lofty religious expectations of women and the reality of society in which these Jewish women lived; this is similar to the lives of Christian women in the same period. This prompted the kabbalistic work Sefer Hakanah to demand that women fulfill the mitzvot in a way that would be equal to men. There is evidence that in some communities of Ashkenaz in the fifteenth century, the wife of the rabbi wore tzitzit just like her husband.

Religious life 
Religious developments during the medieval period included relaxation on prohibitions against teaching women Torah, and the rise of women's prayer groups. One place that women participated in Jewish practices publicly was the synagogue. Women probably learned how to read the liturgy in Hebrew.

According to John Bowker, traditionally, Jewish "men and women pray separately. This goes back to ancient times when women could go only as far as the second court of the Temple." In most synagogues, the women were given their own section, most likely a balcony; some synagogues had a separate building.

Separation from the men was created by the Rabbis in the Mishnah and the Talmud. The reasoning behind the Halacha was that a woman and her body would distract men and give them impure thoughts during prayer. Due to this rabbinical interpretation, scholars have seen the women's role in the synagogue as limited and sometimes even non-existent. However, recent research has shown that women actually had a larger role in the synagogue and the community at large. Women usually attended synagogue, for example, on the Shabbat and the holidays.

Depending on the location of the women in the synagogue, they may have followed the same service as the men or they conducted their own services. Since the synagogues were large, there would be a designated woman who would be able to follow the cantor and repeat the prayers aloud for the women. Women had always attended services on Shabbat and holidays, but beginning in the eleventh century, women became more involved in the synagogue and its rituals. Women sitting separately from the men became a norm in synagogues around the beginning of the thirteenth century. Women, however, did much more than pray in the synagogue. One of the main jobs for women was to beautify the building. There are Torah ark curtains and Torah covers that women sewed and survive today. The synagogue was a communal place for both men and women where worship, learning and community activities occurred.

The rise and increasing popularity of Kabbalah, which emphasized the shechinah and female aspects of the divine presence and human-divine relationship, and which saw marriage as a holy covenant between partners rather than just a civil contract, had great influence. Kabbalists explained the phenomenon of menstruation as expressions of the demonic or sinful character of the menstruant. These changes were accompanied by increased pietistic strictures, including greater requirements for modest dress, and greater strictures during the period of menstruation. At the same time, there was a rise in philosophical and midrashic interpretations depicting women in a negative light, emphasizing a duality between matter and spirit in which femininity was associated, negatively, with earth and matter. The gentile society was also seen as a negative influence on the Jewish community. For example, it seems that Jews would analyze the modesty of their non-Jewish neighbors before officially moving into a new community because they knew that their children would be influenced by the local gentiles.

After the expulsion of the Jews from Spain in 1492, women became virtually the only source of Jewish ritual and tradition in the Catholic world in a phenomenon known as crypto-Judaism. Crypto-Jewish women would slaughter their own animals and made sure to keep as many of the Jewish dietary laws and life cycle rituals as possible without raising suspicion. Occasionally, these women were prosecuted by Inquisition officials for suspicious behavior such as lighting candles to honor the Sabbath or refusing to eat pork when it was offered to them. The Inquisition targeted crypto-Jewish women at least as much as it targeted crypto-Jewish men because women were accused of perpetuating Jewish tradition while men were merely permitting their wives and daughters to organize the household in this manner.

Domestic life 

Marriage, domestic violence and divorce are all topics discussed by Jewish sages of the Medieval world. Marriage is an important institution in Judaism (see Marriage in Judaism). The sages of this period discussed this topic at length. The wife and mother in Hebrew, is called "akeret habayit," which in English translation means "mainstay of the house." In traditional and Orthodox Judaism the akeret habayit, or woman of the house, tends to the family and household duties.

Rabbeinu Gershom instituted a rabbinic decree (Takkanah) prohibiting polygyny among Ashkenazic Jews. At the time, Sephardic and Mizrahi Jews did not recognize the validity of the ban.

The rabbis instituted legal methods to enable women to petition a rabbinical court to compel a divorce. Maimonides ruled that a woman who found her husband "repugnant" could ask a court to compel a divorce by flogging the recalcitrant husband "because she is not like a captive, to be subjected to intercourse with one who is hateful to her". Furthermore, Maimonides ruled that a woman may "consider herself as divorced and remarry" if her husband became absent for three years or more. This was to prevent women married to traveling merchants from becoming an agunah if the husband never returned.

The rabbis also instituted and tightened prohibitions on domestic violence. Rabbi Peretz ben Elijah ruled, "The cry of the daughters of our people has been heard concerning the sons of Israel who raise their hands to strike their wives. Yet who has given a husband the authority to beat his wife?" Rabbi Meir of Rothenberg ruled that, "For it is the way of the Gentiles to behave thus, but Heaven forbid that any Jew should do so. And one who beats his wife is to be excommunicated and banned and beaten." Rabbi Meir of Rothenberg also ruled that a battered wife could petition a rabbinical court to compel a husband to grant a divorce, with a monetary fine owed to her on top of the regular ketubah money. These rulings occurred in the midst of societies where wife-beating was legally sanctioned and routine.

Education 
Jewish women had a limited education. They were taught to read, write, run a household. They were also given some education in religious law that was essential to their daily lives, such as keeping kosher. Both Christian and Jewish girls were educated in the home. Although Christian girls may have had a male or female tutor, most Jewish girls had a female tutor. Higher learning was uncommon for women. (See Female Education in the Medieval Period). There are more sources of education for Jewish women living in Muslim-controlled lands. For example, Middle Eastern Jewry had an abundance of female literates.

Many women gained enough education to help their husbands out in business or even run their own. Jewish women seem to have lent money to Christian women throughout Europe. Women were also copyists, midwives, spinners, and weavers.

Views on the education of women
From certain contexts of the Mishnah and Talmud it can be derived that women should not study Mishnah. There were female Tannaitic Torah jurists such as Rabbi Meir's wife, Rabbi Meir's daughter, and the daughter of Haninah ben Teradion Haninah's daughter is again mentioned as a sage in the non-Talmud third-century text Tractate Semahot verse 12:13. Rabbi Meir's wife is credited with teaching him how to understand some verses from Isaiah. In the Mishnah there is also a reference to certain women teaching men the Torah from behind a curtain, so that no man would be offended.

A yeshiva, or school for Talmudic studies, is an "exclusively masculine environment" because of absence of women from these studies.

Maimonides
Maimonides tended to elevate the status of women above that which was common for the Middle Ages. For example, Maimonides permitted women to study Torah despite the fact that other contemporary and preceding legal opinions of his time did not.

Haim Yosef David Azulai, AKA 'The Hida'
The Hida wrote that women should study the Mishnah only if they want to. According to the Hida, the prohibition of teaching women does not apply to a motivated woman or girl. His response to detractors was that indeed, in truth, there is a prohibition against teaching Mishnah to any student—male or female—who one knows is not properly prepared and motivated.

Yisrael Meir Kagan
One of the most important Ashkenazi rabbanim of the past century, Yisrael Meir Kagan, known popularly as the "Chofetz Chaim", favored Torah education for girls to counteract the French "finishing schools" prevalent in his day for the daughters of the bourgeoisie.  

Joseph Soloveitchik
Rabbi Joseph B. Soloveitchik taught that all religious Ashkenazi Jews, with the exception of hardline Hasidim, not merely should, or solely if they show motivation, but must teach their female children Gemarah like the boy school children: "The halakha prohibiting Torah study for women is not indiscriminate or all-encompassing. ... 'If ever circumstances dictate that study of Torah sh-Ba'al Peh is necessary to provide a firm foundation for faith, such study becomes obligatory and obviously lies beyond the pale of any prohibition.' Undoubtedly, the Rav's prescription was more far-reaching than that of the Hafets Hayim and others. But the difference in magnitude should not obscure their fundamental agreement [on changing the attitudes Halachically]."

Present day

Orthodox Judaism
Orthodox Judaism is based on gendered understandings of Jewish practice (i.e., that there are different roles for men and women in religious life). This reflects the view that all are created unique rather than equal. This emphasizes the view that everyone is created with a specialized, unique role in the world. There are different opinions among Orthodox Jews concerning these differences. Most claim that men and women have complementary yet different roles in religious life resulting in different religious obligations. For example, women are not burdened with time-bound mitzvot. Others believe that some of these differences are not a reflection of religious law, but rather of cultural, social, and historical causes. In the area of education, women were historically exempted from any study beyond an understanding of the practical aspects of Torah and the rules necessary for running a Jewish household; both of which they have an obligation to learn. Until the twentieth century, women were often discouraged from learning Talmud and other advanced Jewish texts. In the past 100 years, Orthodox Jewish education for women has advanced tremendously. This is most embodied in the development of the Bais Yaakov system.

There have been many areas in which Orthodox women have been working toward change within religious life over the past 20 years: promoting advanced women's learning and scholarship, promoting women's ritual inclusion in synagogue, promoting women's communal and religious leadership, and more. Women have been advancing change despite often vocal opposition by rabbinic leaders. Some Orthodox rabbis try to discount changes by claiming that women are motivated by sociological reason rather than "true" religious motivation. For example, Orthodox, Haredi, and Hasidic rabbis discourage women from wearing a kippah, tallit, or tefillin.

In most Orthodox synagogues, women are not entitled to deliver divrei Torah-brief discourses generally on the weekly Torah portion-after or between services; shiurim are typically limited to men, as well. Furthermore, many Orthodox synagogues have physical barriers (known as mechitzot) dividing the left and right sides of the synagogue (rather than the usual division between the main floor and large balconies), with the women's section on one side, and the men's section on the other. Technically, a mechitzah of over four feet or so (ten handbreadths) suffices, even if the men can see the women, though it is not preferable. The mechitza serves to enhance the quality of prayer by ensuring that men are not distracted by the opposite sex. A typical mechitzah consists of wheeled wooden panels, often topped with one-way glass to allow women to view the Torah reading.

Rules of modesty

Although Judaism prescribes modesty for both men and women, the importance of modesty in dress and conduct is particularly stressed among women and girls in Orthodox society. Most Orthodox women only wear skirts, and avoid wearing trousers, and most married Orthodox women cover their hair with a scarf (tichel), snood, hat, beret, or wig.

Rules of family purity

In accordance with Jewish Law, Orthodox Jewish women refrain from bodily contact with their husbands while they are menstruating, and for a period of 7 clean days after menstruating, and after the birth of a child. The Israeli Rabbinate has recently approved women acting as yoatzot, halakhic advisers on sensitive personal matters such as family purity.

Modern Orthodox Judaism
Rabbi Joseph B. Soloveitchik, a leader of profound influence in modern Orthodoxy in the United States, discouraged women from serving as presidents of synagogues or any other official positions of leadership, from performing other mitzvot (commandments) traditionally performed by males exclusively, such as wearing a tallit or tefillin. A minor reason argued for why only men wear tefillin is that the tefillin help keep men from thinking impure thoughts. Women are thought not to need help with this. Soloveitchik wrote that while women do not lack the capability to perform such acts, there is no mesorah (Jewish tradition) that permits it. In making his decision, he relied upon Jewish oral law, including a mishnah in Chulin 2a and a Beit Yoseph in the Tur Yoreh Deah stating that a woman can perform a specific official communal service for her own needs, but not those of others.

Women's issues garnered more interest with the advent of feminism. Many Modern Orthodox Jewish women and Modern Orthodox rabbis sought to provide greater and more advanced Jewish education for women. Since most Modern Orthodox women attend college, and many receive advanced degrees in a variety of fields, Modern Orthodox communities promote women's secular education. A few Modern Orthodox Synagogues have women serving as clergy, including Gilah Kletenik at Congregation Kehilath Jeshurun. In 2013, Yeshivat Maharat, located in the United States, became the first Orthodox institution to consecrate female clergy. The graduates of Yeshivat Maharat did not call themselves "rabbis". The title they were given is "maharat". However, in 2015, Yaffa Epstein was ordained as Rabba by Yeshivat Maharat. Also in 2015, Lila Kagedan was ordained as Rabbi by that same organization, making her their first graduate to take the title "Rabbi".

In 2013, Malka Schaps became the first female Haredi dean at an Israeli university when she was appointed dean of Bar Ilan University's Faculty of Exact Sciences. Also in 2013, the first class of female halachic advisers trained to practice in the US graduated; they graduated from the North American branch of Nishmat's yoetzet halacha program in a ceremony at Congregation Sheartith Israel, Spanish and Portuguese Synagogue in Manhattan, and SAR High School in Riverdale, New York, began allowing girls to wrap tefillin during Shacharit-morning prayer in an all-female prayer group; it is probably the first Modern Orthodox high school in the U.S. to do so.

In 2014, the first-ever book of halachic decisions written by women who were ordained to serve as poskot (Idit Bartov and Anat Novoselsky) was published. The women were ordained by the municipal chief rabbi of Efrat, Rabbi Shlomo Riskin, after completing Midreshet Lindenbaum women's college's five-year ordination course in advanced studies in Jewish law, as well as passing examinations equivalent to the rabbinate's requirement for men.

In 2010, Sara Hurwitz became the first woman to ordained as a "Rabba", or female equivalent of a rabbi, when she started serving as an "Open Orthodox" spiritual leader at Riverdale, Bronx, New York On June 10, 2015, Dr. Meesh Hammer-Kossoy and Rahel Berkovits became the first two women to be ordained as Modern Orthodox Jewish Rabbas in Israel.

In June 2015, Lila Kagedan was ordained by Yeshivat Maharat and in keeping with newer policies, was given the freedom to choose her own title, and she chose to be addressed as "Rabbi". She officially became the first female Modern Orthodox rabbi in the United States of America when the Modern Orthodox Mount Freedom Jewish Center in Randolph, New Jersey hired her as a spiritual leader in January 2016. As of 2019, Kagedan is working as the rabbi at Walnut Street Synagogue.

In the fall of 2015, the Agudath Israel of America denounced moves to ordain women, and went even further, declaring Yeshivat Maharat, Yeshivat Chovevei Torah, Open Orthodoxy, and other affiliated entities to be similar to other dissident movements throughout Jewish history in having rejected basic tenets of Judaism.

Also in the fall of 2015, the Rabbinical Council of America passed a resolution which states, "RCA members with positions in Orthodox institutions may not ordain women into the Orthodox rabbinate, regardless of the title used; or hire or ratify the hiring of a woman into a rabbinic position at an Orthodox institution; or allow a title implying rabbinic ordination to be used by a teacher of Limudei Kodesh in an Orthodox institution."

Also in 2015, Jennie Rosenfeld became the first female Orthodox spiritual advisor in Israel. (Specifically, she became the spiritual advisor, also called manhiga ruchanit, for the community of Efrat.)

In 2016, it was announced that Ephraim Mirvis created the job of ma'ayan by which women would be advisers on Jewish law in the area of family purity and as adult educators in Orthodox synagogues. This requires a part-time training course for 18 months, which is the first such course in the United Kingdom. On August 23, 2016, Karmit Feintuch became the first woman in Jerusalem, Israel, to be hired as a Modern Orthodox "rabbanit" and serve as a spiritual leader.

In 2017, the Orthodox Union adopted a policy banning women from serving as clergy, from holding titles such as "rabbi", or from doing common clergy functions even without a title, in its congregations in the United States.

Women's prayer groups

Separate Jewish women's prayer groups were a sanctioned custom among German Jews in the Middle Ages. The Kol Bo provides, in the laws for Tisha B'Av:

And they recite dirges there for about a quarter of the night, the men in their synagogue and the women in their synagogue. And likewise during the day the men recite dirges by themselves and the women by themselves, until about a third of the day has passed.

In Germany, in the twelfth and thirteenth centuries, women's prayer groups were led by female cantors. Rabbi Eliezer of Worms, in his elegy for his wife Dulca, praised her for teaching the other women how to pray and embellishing the prayer with music. The gravestone of Urania of Worms, who died in 1275, contains the inscription "who sang piyyutim for the women with musical voice". In the Nurnberg Memorial Book, one Richenza was inscribed with the title "prayer leader of the women".

Orthodox women more recently began holding organized women's tefila (prayer) groups beginning in the 1970s. While all Orthodox legal authorities agree that women are prohibited from forming a minyan (prayer quorum) for the purpose of regular services, women in these groups have read the prayers and study Torah. A number of leaders from all segments of Orthodox Judaism have commented on this issue, but it has had a little, although growing, impact on Haredi and Sephardi Judaism. However, the emergence of this phenomenon has enmeshed Modern Orthodox Judaism in a debate which still continues today. There are three schools of thought on this issue:

 The most restrictive view, held by a few rabbis, rules that all women's prayer groups are absolutely forbidden by halakha (Jewish law).
 A more liberal, permissive view maintains that women's prayer groups can be compatible with halakha, but only if they do not carry out a full prayer service (i. e., do not include certain parts of the service known as devarim shebikedusha that require a minyan; for example the recital of Kaddish or reading from the Torah), and only if services are spiritually and sincerely motivated, as is usually the case; they cannot be sanctioned if they are inspired by a desire to rebel against halakha. People in this group include Rabbi Avraham Elkana Shapiro, former British Chief Rabbi Immanuel Jakobovits, and Rabbi Avi Weiss. This is the generally followed view.
 A third view argues in favor of the acceptability of calling women to the Torah in mixed services, and leading certain parts of the service which do not require a minyan, under certain conditions.

In 2013, the Israeli Orthodox rabbinical organization Beit Hillel issued a halachic ruling which allows women, for the first time, to say the Kaddish prayer in memory of their deceased parents.

Women as witnesses
Traditionally, women are not generally permitted to serve as witnesses in an Orthodox Beit Din (rabbinical court), although they have recently been permitted to serve as toanot (advocates) in those courts. Women are also permitted to provide evidence under oath, and their statements are considered to be fully credible in ritual matters. The exclusion of women as witnesses has exceptions which have required exploration under rabbinic law, as the role of women in society and the obligations of religious groups under external civil law have been subject to increasing recent scrutiny.

The recent case of Rabbi Mordecai Tendler, the first rabbi to be expelled from the Rabbinical Council of America following allegations of sexual harassment, illustrated the importance of clarification of Orthodox halakha in this area. Rabbi Tendler claimed that the tradition of exclusion of women's testimony should compel the RCA to disregard the allegations. He argued that since the testimony of a woman could not be admitted in Rabbinical court, there were no valid witnesses against him, and hence, the case for his expulsion had to be thrown out for lack of evidence. In a ruling of importance for Orthodox women's capacity for legal self-protection under Jewish law, Haredi Rabbi Benzion Wosner, writing on behalf of the Shevet Levi Beit Din (Rabbinical court) of Monsey, New York, identified sexual harassment cases as coming under a class of exceptions to the traditional exclusion, under which "even children or women" have not only a right, but an obligation, to testify, and can be relied upon by a rabbinical court as valid witnesses:

The Ramah in Choshen Mishpat (Siman 35, 14) rules that in a case where only women congregate, or in a case where only women could possibly testify (in this case, the alleged harassment occurred behind closed doors), they can, and should, certainly testify. (Terumas Hadeshen Siman 353 and Agudah Perek 10, Yochasin)

This is also the ruling of the Maharik, Radvaz, and the Mahar"i of Minz. Even those Poskim that would normally not rely on women witnesses, they would certainly agree that in our case ... where there is ample evidence that this Rabbi violated Torah precepts, then even children or women can certainly be kosher as witnesses, as the Chasam Sofer pointed out in his sefer (monograph) (Orach Chaim T'shuvah 11)

The Rabbinical Council of America, while initially relying on its own investigation, chose to rely on the Halakhic ruling of the Haredi Rabbinical body as authoritative in the situation.

Orthodox approaches to change
Leaders of the Haredi community have been steadfast in their opposition to a change in the role of women, arguing that the religious and social constraints on women, as dictated by traditional Jewish texts, are timeless, and are not affected by contemporary social change. Many also argue that giving traditionally male roles to women will only detract from both women's and men's ability to lead truly fulfilling lives. Haredim have also sometimes perceived arguments for liberalization as in reality stemming from antagonism to Jewish law and beliefs generally, arguing that preserving faith requires resisting secular and "un-Jewish" ideas.

Modern Orthodox Judaism, particularly in its more liberal variants, has tended to look at proposed changes in the role of women on a specific, case-by-case basis, focusing on arguments regarding the religious and legal role of specific prayers, rituals and activities individually. Such arguments have tended to focus on cases where the Talmud and other traditional sources express multiple or more liberal viewpoints, particularly where the role of women in the past was arguably broader than in more recent times. Feminist advocates within Orthodoxy have tended to stay within the traditional legal process of argumentation, seeking a gradualist approach, and avoiding wholesale arguments against the religious tradition as such. Nevertheless, a growing Orthodox feminist movement seeks to address gender inequalities.

Agunot
Agunot (Hebrew: "chained women") are women who wish to divorce their husbands, but whose husbands refuse to give them a divorce contract (a "get"). The word can also refer to a woman whose husband disappeared and may or may not be dead. In Orthodox Judaism, only a man is able to serve a "get". In order to prevent the occurrence of the first type, many Jewish couples sign a prenuptial agreement designed to force the husband to serve a get or else be reported to the Jewish court.

Conservative Judaism

Although the position of Conservative Judaism toward women originally differed little from the Orthodox position, it has in recent years minimized legal and ritual differences between men and women. The Committee on Jewish Law and Standards (CJLS) of the Rabbinical Assembly has approved a number of decisions and responsa on this topic. These provide for women's active participation in areas such as:

Publicly reading the Torah (ba'al kriah)
Being counted as part of a minyan
Being called for an aliyah to read the Torah
Serving as a cantor (shaliach tzibbur)
Serving as rabbi and halakhic decisor (posek - an arbiter in matters of religious law)
Wearing a tallit and tefillin

A rabbi may or may not decide to adopt particular rulings for the congregation; thus, some Conservative congregations will be more or less egalitarian than others. However, there are other areas where legal differences remain between men and women, including:
Matrilineal descent. The child of a Jewish mother is born Jewish; the child of a Jewish father is born Jewish if and only if the mother is Jewish.
Pidyon Ha-Bat, a proposed ceremony based on the biblical redemption of the eldest newborn son (Pidyon Ha-Ben). The CJLS has stated that this particular ceremony should not be performed. Other ceremonies, such as a Simchat Bat (welcoming a newborn daughter), should instead be used to mark the special status of a new born daughter. [CJLS teshuvah by Rabbi Gerald C. Skolnik, 1993]

A Conservative Jewish ketuba includes a clause that puts a husband and wife on more equal footing when it comes to marriage and divorce law within halacha.

The CJLS recently reaffirmed the obligation of Conservative women to observe niddah (sexual abstinence during and after menstruation) and mikvah (ritual immersion) following menstruation, although somewhat liberalizing certain details. Such practices, while requirements of Conservative Judaism, are not widely observed among Conservative laity.

Changes in the Conservative position

Prior to 1973, Conservative Judaism had more limited roles for women and was more similar to current Orthodoxy. However, there were some notable changes in favor of expanded roles for women in Conservative Judaism prior to 1973. In 1946, the new Silverman siddur changed the traditional words of thanking God for "not making me a woman", instead using words thanking God for "making me a free person." In 1955, the CJLS of the Rabbinical Assembly issued a decision that allowed women to have an aliyah at Torah-readings services.

In 1973, the CJLS of the Rabbinical Assembly voted, without issuing an opinion, that women could count in a minyan.

There was a special commission appointed by the Conservative movement to study the issue of ordaining women as rabbis, which met between 1977 and 1978, and consisted of eleven men and three women; the women were Marian Siner Gordon, an attorney, Rivkah Harris, an Assyriologist, and Francine Klagsbrun, a writer. In 1983, the Jewish Theological Seminary of America (JTSA) faculty voted, also without accompanying opinion, to ordain women as rabbis and as cantors. Paula Hyman, among others, took part in the vote as a member of the JTS faculty.

In 2002, the CJLS adapted a responsum by Rabbi David Fine, Women and the Minyan, which provides an official religious-law foundation for women counting in a minyan and explains the current Conservative approach to the role of women in prayer. This responsum holds that although Jewish women do not traditionally have the same obligations as men, Conservative women have, as a collective whole, voluntarily undertaken them. Because of this collective undertaking, the Fine responsum holds that Conservative women are eligible to serve as agents and decision-makers for others. The responsum also holds that traditionally minded communities and individual women can opt out without being regarded by the Conservative movement as sinning. By adopting this responsum, the CJLS found itself in a position to provide a considered Jewish-law justification for its egalitarian practices, without having to rely on potentially unconvincing arguments, undermine the religious importance of community and clergy, ask individual women intrusive questions, repudiate the halakhic tradition, or label women following traditional practices as sinners.

In 2006, the CJLS adopted three responsa on the subject of niddah, which reaffirmed an obligation of Conservative women to abstain from sexual relations during and following menstruation and to immerse in a mikvah prior to resumption, while liberalizing observance requirements including shortening the length of the niddah period, lifting restrictions on non-sexual contact during niddah, and reducing the circumstances under which spotting and similar conditions would mandate abstinence.

In all cases, continuing the Orthodox approach was also upheld as an option. Individual Conservative rabbis and synagogues are not required to adopt any of these changes, and a small number have adopted none of them.

Conservative approaches to change
Prior to 1973, Conservative approaches to change were generally on an individual, case-by-case basis. Between 1973 and 2002, the Conservative movement adapted changes through its official organizations, but without issuing explanatory opinions. Since 2002, the Conservative movement has coalesced around a single across-the board approach to the role of women in Jewish law.

In 1973, 1983, and 1993, individual rabbis and professors issued six major opinions which influenced change in the Conservative approach, the first and second Sigal, Blumenthal, Rabinowitz, and Roth responsa, and the Hauptman article. These opinions sought to provide for a wholesale shift in women's public roles through a single, comprehensive legal justification. Most such opinions based their positions on an argument that Jewish women always were, or have become, legally obligated to perform the same mitzvot as men and to do so in the same manner.

The first Sigal and the Blumenthal responsa were considered by the CJLS as part of its decision on prayer roles in 1973. They argued that women have always had the same obligations as men. The first Sigal responsum used the Talmud's general prayer obligation and examples of cases in which women were traditionally obligated to say specific prayers and inferred from them a public prayer obligation identical to that of men. The Blumenthal responsum extrapolated from a minority authority that a minyan could be formed with nine men and one woman in an emergency. The Committee on Jewish Law and Standards (CJLS) declined to adopt either responsum. Rabbi Siegel reported to the Rabbinical Assembly membership that many on the CJLS, while agreeing with the result, found the arguments unconvincing.

The Rabinowitz, Roth, and second Sigal responsa were considered by the JTSA faculty as part of its decision to ordain women as rabbis in 1983. The Rabbinowitz responsum sidestepped the issue of obligation, arguing that there is no longer a religious need for a community representative in prayer and hence there is no need to decide whether a woman can halakhically serve as one. The CJLS felt that an argument potentially undermining the value of community and clergy was unconvincing: "We should not be afraid to recognize that the function of clergy is to help our people connect with the holy." The Roth and second Sigal responsa accepted that time-bound mitzvot were traditionally optional for women, but argued that women in modern times could change their traditional roles. The Roth responsum argued that women could individually voluntarily assume the same obligations as men, and that women who do so (e. g., pray three times a day regularly) could count in a minyan and serve as agents. The JTSA accordingly required female rabbinical students wishing to train as rabbis to personally obligate themselves, but synagogue rabbis, unwilling to inquire into individual religiosity, found it impractical. The second Sigal responsum called for a takkanah, or rabbinical edict, "that would serve as a halakhic ERA", overruling all non-egalitarian provisions in law or, in the alternative, a new approach to halakhic interpretation independent of legal precedents. The CJLS, unwilling to use either an intrusive approach or a repudiation of the traditional legal process as bases for action, did not adopt either and let the JTS faculty vote stand unexplained.

In 1993, Professor Judith Hauptman of JTS issued an influential paper arguing that women had historically always been obligated in prayer, using more detailed arguments than the Blumenthal and first Sigal responsa. The paper suggested that women who followed traditional practices were failing to meet their obligations. Rabbi Roth argued that Conservative Judaism should think twice before adopting a viewpoint labeling its most traditional and often most committed members as sinners. The issue was again dropped.

In 2002, the CJLS returned to the issue of justifying its actions regarding women's status, and adopted a single authoritative approach, the Fine responsum, as the definitive Conservative halakha on role-of-women issues. This responsum holds that although Jewish women do not traditionally have the same obligations as men, Conservative women have, as a collective whole, voluntarily undertaken them. Because of this collective undertaking, the Fine responsum holds that Conservative women are eligible to serve as agents and decision-makers for others. The Responsum also holds that traditionally minded communities and individual women can opt out without being regarded by the Conservative movement as sinning. By adopting this Responsum, the CJLS found itself in a position to provide a considered Jewish-law justification for its egalitarian practices, without having to rely on potentially unconvincing arguments, undermine the religious importance of community and clergy, ask individual women intrusive questions, repudiate the halakhic tradition, or label women following traditional practices as sinners.

Reform Judaism

Reform Judaism believes in the equality of men and women. The Reform movement rejects the idea that halakha (Jewish law) is the sole legitimate form of Jewish decision making, and holds that Jews can and must consider their conscience and ethical principles inherent in the Jewish tradition when deciding upon a right course of action. There is widespread consensus among Reform Jews that traditional distinctions between the role of men and women are antithetical to the deeper ethical principles of Judaism. This has enabled Reform communities to allow women to perform many rituals traditionally reserved for men, such as:
Publicly reading the Torah (ba'al kriah)
Being part of the minyan
Being called for an aliyah to read the Torah
Serving as a cantor (shalich tzibbur)
Serving as rabbi and halakhic decisor (posek)
Wearing a tallit and tefillin

Concerns about intermarriage have also influenced the Reform Jewish position on gender. In 1983, the Central Conference of American Rabbis passed a resolution waiving the need for formal conversion for anyone with at least one Jewish parent who has made affirmative acts of Jewish identity. This departed from the traditional position requiring formal conversion to Judaism for children without a Jewish mother. The 1983 resolution of the American Reform movement has had a mixed reception in Reform Jewish communities outside of the United States. Most notably, the Israel Movement for Progressive Judaism has rejected patrilineal descent and requires formal conversion for anyone without a Jewish mother. As well, a joint Orthodox, Traditional, Conservative and Reform Bet Din formed in Denver, Colorado to promote uniform standards for conversion to Judaism was dissolved in 1983, due to that Reform resolution. However, in 2015 the majority of Britain's Assembly of Reform Rabbis voted in favor of a position paper proposing "that individuals who live a Jewish life, and who are patrilineally Jewish, can be welcomed into the Jewish community and confirmed as Jewish through an individual process". Britain's Assembly of Reform Rabbis stated that rabbis "would be able to take local decisions – ratified by the Beit Din – confirming Jewish status".

Liberal prayerbooks tend increasingly to avoid male-specific words and pronouns, seeking that all references to God in translations be made in gender-neutral language. For example, the UK Liberal movement's Siddur Lev Chadash (1995) does so, as does the UK Reform Movement's Forms of Prayer (2008). In Mishkan T'filah, the American Reform Jewish prayer book released in 2007, references to God as "He" have been removed, and whenever Jewish patriarchs are named (Abraham, Isaac, and Jacob), so also are the matriarchs (Sarah, Rebecca, Rachel, and Leah.)  In 2015 the Reform Jewish High Holy Days prayer book Mishkan HaNefesh was released; it is intended as a companion to Mishkan T'filah. It includes a version of the High Holy Days prayer Avinu Malkeinu that refers to God as both "Loving Father" and "Compassionate Mother". Other notable changes are replacing a line from the Reform movement's earlier prayerbook, "Gates of Repentance", that mentioned the joy of a bride and groom specifically, with the line "rejoicing with couples under the chuppah [wedding canopy]", and adding a third, non-gendered option to the way worshippers are called to the Torah, offering "mibeit", Hebrew for "from the house of", in addition to the traditional "son of" or "daughter of".

In 2008, Stacy Offner became the first female vice president of the Union for Reform Judaism, a position she held for two years. In 2015, Daryl Messinger became the first female chair of the Union.

Reform approaches to change
Reform Judaism generally holds that the various differences between the roles of men and women in traditional Jewish law are not relevant to modern conditions and not applicable today. Accordingly, there has been no need to develop legal arguments analogous to those made within the Orthodox and Conservative movements.

Reconstructionist Judaism 
The equality of women and men is a central tenet and hallmark of Reconstructionist Judaism. From the beginning, Reconstructionist Jewish ritual allowed men and women to pray together—a decision based on egalitarian philosophy. It was on this basis that Rabbi Mordecai Kaplan called for the full equality of women and men, despite the obvious difficulties reconciling this stance with norms of traditional Jewish practice. The Reconstructionist Movement ordained women rabbis from the start. In 1968, women were accepted into the Reconstructionist Rabbinical College, under the leadership of Ira Eisenstein. The first ordained female Reconstructionist rabbi, Sandy Eisenberg Sasso, served as rabbi of the Manhattan Reconstructionist Congregation in 1976, and gained a pulpit in 1977 at Beth El Zedeck congregation in Indianapolis. Sandy Eisenberg Sasso was accepted without debate or subsequent controversy. In 2005, 24 out of the movement's 106 synagogues in the US had women as senior or assistant rabbis. In 2013 Rabbi Deborah Waxman was elected as the President of the Reconstructionist Rabbinical College. As the President, she is believed to be the first woman and first lesbian to lead a Jewish congregational union, and the first female rabbi and first lesbian to lead a Jewish seminary; the Reconstructionist Rabbinical College is both a congregational union and a seminary.

The Reconstructionist Community began including women in the minyan and allowing them to come up to the Torah for aliyot. They also continued the practice of bat mitzvah. Reconstructionist Judaism also allowed women to perform other traditional male tasks, such as serving as witnesses, leading services, public Torah reading, and wearing ritual prayer garments like kippot and tallitot. Female Reconstructionist rabbis have been instrumental in the creation of rituals, stories, and music that have begun to give women's experience a voice in Judaism. Most of the focus has been on rituals for life-cycle events. New ceremonies have been created for births, weddings, divorces, conversions, weaning, and the onset of menarche and menopause. The Reconstructionist movement as a whole has been committed to creating liturgy that is in consonance with gender equality and the celebration of women's lives. Another major step: The Federation of Reconstructionist Congregations has also developed educational programs that teach the full acceptance of lesbians, as well as rituals that affirm lesbian relationships. Reconstructionist rabbis officiate at same-sex weddings. Reconstructionist Judaism also allows openly LGBT men and women to be ordained as rabbis and cantors.

Several prominent members of the Reconstructionist community have focused on issues like domestic violence. Others have devoted energy to helping women gain the right of divorce in traditional Jewish communities. Many have spoken out for the right of Jewish women to pray aloud and read from the Torah at the Western Wall in Jerusalem, particularly members of the Women of the Wall group.

When the roles of women in religion change, there may also be changed roles for men. With their acceptance of patrilineal descent in 1979, the Reconstructionist Rabbinical Association supported the principle that a man can pass Judaism on to the next generation as well as a woman.

Jewish Renewal 
Jewish Renewal is a recent movement in Judaism which endeavors to reinvigorate modern Judaism with Kabbalistic, Hasidic, musical and meditative practices; it describes itself as "a worldwide, transdenominational movement grounded in Judaism's prophetic and mystical traditions". The Jewish Renewal movement ordains women as well as men as rabbis and cantors. Lynn Gottlieb became the first female rabbi in Jewish Renewal in 1981, and Avitall Gerstetter, who lives in Germany, became the first female cantor in Jewish Renewal (and the first female cantor in Germany) in 2002. In 2009 and 2012 respectively, OHALAH (Association of Rabbis for Jewish Renewal) issued a board statement and a resolution supporting Women of the Wall. The Statement of Principles of OHALAH states in part, "Our local communities will embody egalitarian and inclusive values, manifested in a variety of leadership and decision-making structures, ensuring that women and men are full and equal partners in every aspect of our communal Jewish life." In 2014 OHALAH issued a board resolution stating in part, "Therefore, be it resolved that: OHALAH supports the observance of Women's History Month, International Women's Day, and Women's Equality Day; OHALAH condemns all types of sexism; OHALAH is committed to gender equality, now and in all generations to come; and OHALAH supports equal rights regardless of gender." Also in 2014, ALEPH: Alliance for Jewish Renewal issued a statement stating, "ALEPH: Alliance for Jewish Renewal supports the observance of Women's History Month, International Women's Day, and Women's Equality Day, condemns all types of sexism, is committed to gender equality, now and in all generations to come, and supports equal rights regardless of gender, in recognition and allegiance to the view that we are all equally created in the Divine Image."

Humanistic Judaism 
Humanistic Judaism is a movement in Judaism that offers a non-theistic alternative in contemporary Jewish life. It ordains both men and women as rabbis, and its first rabbi was a woman, Tamara Kolton, who was ordained in 1999. Its first cantor was also a woman, Deborah Davis, ordained in 2001; however, Humanistic Judaism has since stopped ordaining cantors. The Society for Humanistic Judaism issued a statement in 1996 stating in part, "We affirm that a woman has the moral right and should have the continuing legal right to decide whether or not to terminate a pregnancy in accordance with her own ethical standards. Because a decision to terminate a pregnancy carries serious, irreversible consequences, it is one to be made with great care and with keen awareness of the complex psychological, emotional, and ethical implications." They also issued a statement in 2011 condemning the then-recent passage of the "No Taxpayer Funding for Abortion Act" by the U.S. House of Representatives, which they called "a direct attack on a women's right to choose". In 2012, they issued a resolution opposing conscience clauses that allow religious-affiliated institutions to be exempt from generally applicable requirements mandating reproductive healthcare services to individuals or employees. In 2013 they issued a resolution stating in part, "Therefore, be it resolved that: The Society for Humanistic Judaism wholeheartedly supports the observance of Women's Equality Day on August 26 to commemorate the anniversary of the passage of the Nineteenth Amendment to the U.S. Constitution allowing women to vote; The Society condemns gender discrimination in all its forms, including restriction of rights, limited access to education, violence, and subjugation; and The Society commits itself to maintain vigilance and speak out in the fight to bring gender equality to our generation and to the generations that follow."

Women as "sofrot" (scribes) 
Sofrot is the feminine plural of Sofer. A Sopher, Sopher, Sofer STaM, or Sofer ST"M (Heb: "scribe", סופר סת״ם) is a Jewish scribe who is able and entitled to transcribe Torah scrolls, tefillin and mezuzot, and other religious writings. (ST"M, סת״ם, is an abbreviation for Sefer Torahs, Tefillin, and Mezuzot. The masculine plural of sofer is "sofrim" סופרים).

Forming the basis for the discussion of women becoming sofrot, Talmud Gittin 45b states: "Sifrei Torah, tefillin, and mezuzot written by a heretic, a star-worshipper, a slave, a woman, a minor, a Cuthean, or an apostate Jew, are unfit for ritual use." The rulings on Mezuzah and Tefillin are virtually undisputed among those who hold to the Talmudic Law. As Arba'ah Turim does not include women in its list of those ineligible to write Sifrei Torah, some see this as proof that women are permitted to write a Torah scroll. However today, virtually all Orthodox (both Modern and Ultra) authorities contest the idea that a woman is permitted to write a Sefer Torah. Yet women are permitted to inscribe Ketubot (marriage contracts), STaM not intended for ritual use, and other writings of Sofrut beyond simple STaM. In 2003, Canadian Aviel Barclay became the world's first known traditionally trained female sofer. In 2007 Jen Taylor Friedman, a British woman, became the first female sofer to scribe a Sefer Torah. In 2010 the first Sefer Torah scribed by a group of women (six female sofers, who were from Brazil, Canada, Israel, and the United States) was completed; this was known as the Women's Torah Project. Also, not just any man may write a Sefer Torah; they should ideally be written by a "G-d-fearing person" who knows at least the first layer of meanings, some of them hidden, in the Torah.

From October 2010 until spring 2011, Julie Seltzer, one of the female sofers from the Women's Torah Project, scribed a Sefer Torah as part of an exhibition at the Contemporary Jewish Museum in San Francisco. This makes her the first American female sofer to scribe a Sefer Torah; Julie Seltzer was born in Philadelphia and is non-denominationally Jewish. From spring 2011 until August 2012 she scribed another Sefer Torah, this time for the Reform congregation Beth Israel in San Diego. Seltzer was taught mostly by Jen Taylor Friedman. On September 22, 2013, Congregation Beth Elohim of New York dedicated a new Torah, which members of Beth Elohim said was the first Torah in New York City to be completed by a woman. The Torah was scribed by Linda Coppleson. As of 2014, there are an estimated 50 female sofers in the world.

See also

Bat-Kohen (daughter of a priest)
Bat Levi (daughter of a Levite) 
First World Congress of Jewish Women, 1923
Jewish feminism
List of Jewish feminists
Women as theological figures
Women as rabbis
Rebbetzin or Rabbanit (rabbi's wife)
List of women in the Bible
Bais Yaakov (schools for Haredi girls)
Niddah (menstruation laws)
Soferet (Jewish scribe who can transcribe religious documents)
Gender and Judaism
Tzniut (modest behavior)
Negiah (guidelines for physical contact)
Yichud (prohibitions of secluding oneself with a stranger)
Jewish view of marriage
Shidduch (finding a marriage partner)
Shalom bayit (peace and harmony in the relationship between husband and wife)
Zeved habat or Simchat Bat (Jewish baby naming ceremony for girls)
Minyan (quorum of at least ten Jews acceptable for the recitation of certain prayers)
Partnership minyan (a movement to give women more roles in prayer services)
Agunah (a woman who wishes to divorce her husband, but her husband refused to provide her with a Jewish divorce contract)
Women in Israel
Women's Torah Project
Women of the Wall

References

External links
General
 Chabad.org: The Jewish Woman
 Jewish Orthodox Feminist Alliance 
 Jewish Coalition Against Domestic Abuse
 Na'amat USA
 Orthodox Union: The Women's Initiative
 Yeshiva University - Stern College for Women

Publications
 Lilith Magazine a Jewish feminist journal
 Women in Judaism on online peer-reviewed journal covering women in Judaism, with a special emphasis on history, but also including book reviews and fiction.

Particular issues
 "Wuhsha the Broker: Jewish Women in the Medieval Economy", Jewish History Lecture by Dr. Henry Abramson
 "Rachel, Wife of Akiva: Women in Ancient Israel", Video Lecture by Dr. Henry Abramson
 "Gluckel of Hameln: Jewish Women in the 17th Century", Video Lecture by Dr. Henry Abramson
 Spots of Light: Women in the Holocaust an online exhibition by Yad Vashem
 The Kiddushin Variations A Directory of Halakhic Possibilities For A More Egalitarian Kiddushin Ritual.
 History of Women as Rabbis from the Jewish Virtual Library
 "Sense and Sensibilities: Women and Torah Study", Bryna Levy, Jewish Action, Winter 1998, 59 (2).
 
 
 "Women and Prayer: An Attempt to Dispel Some Fallacies", Judith Hauptman, Judaism 42 (1993): 94-103.
  , Fine, David. Committee on Jewish Law and Standards of the Rabbinical Assembly (Conservative), 2002
 Egalitarian Jewish Services A Discussion Paper
 , Jewish Action, Winter 2004.
 "Women and Minyan" , Tradition, 1988. Summary of Orthodox arguments regarding women counting in minyan for certain purposes
 "Women's Prayer Services Theory and Practice" , Tradition, 1998. Summary of Orthodox arguments for and against women's prayer groups
 Elissa Strauss, Women Who Write Torah, A New Generation of Female Scribes Makes History. The Jewish Daily Forward, November 19, 2010.
 (French) Harvey, Claire. Femmes et judaïsme - Des femmes veulent changer la loi juive concernant le divorce, Le Devoir, 24 April 2010.
 Mordecai Kaplan, Jewish Women's Archive, 2005
 Luo, Michael, An Orthodox Jewish Woman, and Soon, a Spiritual Leader, New York Times, August 21, 2006.
 Reconstructionist Judaism in the United States, Jewish Women's archive, 2005
 Who is a Reconstructionist Jew? Jewish Virtuel Library, 2001.

Further reading

Middle Ages

Orthodox Judaism and women
 
 
 
 
 
 
 

 
 
 
 

 
Judaism
Judaism